Lees–McRae College is a private college in Banner Elk, North Carolina, affiliated with the Presbyterian Church (USA). It is one of the few colleges to be named after two women, Suzanna Lees and Elizabeth McRae.

History
Lees–McRae College was founded in Banner Elk as an all-female high school in 1899 by the Reverend Edgar Tufts, a Presbyterian minister. He named the school The Elizabeth McRae Institute after a well-respected educator in 1900. The name of school benefactor Suzanna Lees was added in 1903, and the school became The Lees–McRae Institute when it was chartered by the state in 1907.

An all-male branch was founded in 1907 in nearby Plumtree, North Carolina. The Plumtree facility was destroyed in a 1927 fire, leading the two campuses to merge at the Banner Elk site. After the merger, the high school program was phased out, and in 1931 the institute was renamed Lees–McRae College as an accredited, coeducational junior college.

Lees–McRae began moving toward offering a four-year program in the late 1980s, and the school's president made the recommendation to the board of trustees in 1987. The Southern Association of Colleges and Schools granted Lees–McRae status as a four-year college in 1990. In 2005, Lees–McRae became the first expansion site for New Opportunity School for Women, a program that helps educate and employ women in Appalachia.

Campus
Landmarks on campus include the historic Rock House, built in 1920 of native stone; Tufts Tower, a former water tower that houses the campus chimes; and the North Carolina Building, completed in 1922 and one of three permanent buildings planned by the college's founder. Also, there is Tate Residence Hall, originally the town hospital; and Tennessee and Virginia residence halls, constructed from stones from those respective states. The college's bookstore, named The Exchange, accepted chickens, pigs, grain, other crops and livestock in exchange for education costs in the early years of the college's history.

In 2003, the college saw its first major construction in 20 years with the opening of the Arthur–Lauritsen–Sanders Track and Field Venue.
In 2008, the William Reynolds Gymnasium, originally built in 1938 with the aid of students, was renovated as part of the new Carol and Glenn Arthur Student Recreation Complex.

In 2020, a new, state-of-the-art turf surface was installed at Tate Field.

In 2021, The Summit, the campus dining hall, was completely renovated. The new space, with timber beam ceilings and stone accents, highlights the "in, of, and for the mountains" aesthetic of the campus grounds.

A comprehensive renovation of Historic Commons began in early 2022. The work includes a complete renovation of the Tennessee and Virginia residence halls, plus the repurposement of the North Carolina Building to serve as a student hub. In addition, the Cannon Classrooms and North Carolina Annex will be replaced with new modern structures. The highlight of the project will be a complete restoration of the Pinnacle Room, the college's original dining room. Behind Historic Commons, a new recreation lawn and improved parking access will round out the project.

Housing
There are several residence halls at Lees–McRae College, providing multiple college living experiences; many of the housing options are even pet-friendly. Housing facilities include the following:

Avery Residence Hall
Baldwin Residence Hall
Bentley Residence Hall
Bobcat Way Houses
Cannon Cottage
Hemlock Village
McMillan Residence Hall
Tate Residence Hall
Tennessee Residence Hall
Virginia Residence Hall

Organization
The college has seven academic divisions: Business Administration, Creative and Fine Arts, Education, Humanities, Nursing and Allied Health, Science and Mathematics, and Social and Behavioral Sciences. The college offers 15 majors. During its junior college days, the college awarded the Associate of Arts and Associate of Science degrees. In 1990 the associate degree programs were abandoned and students began courses of study for the Bachelor of Arts or Bachelor of Science degree. The college offers degree completion programs in birth–kindergarten education, elementary education, criminal justice, and nursing at three community college sites in Western North Carolina. The Theatre Arts Department also offers a Bachelor of Fine Arts degree.

Sports, clubs, and traditions
The athletic department offers intramural opportunities for several sports. The newest is the competitive climbing team as a club sport.

Several programs are available to students interested in leadership, service or the outdoors. These programs range from the school's own Campus After The Class Hours (CATCH), KIBO Emerging Leaders, and Outdoor Programs, to national programs like AmeriCorps Bonner Leaders.

Athletics

The Lees–McRae Bobcats compete in NCAA Division II as a member of Conference Carolinas. All athletic teams are eligible for athletic scholarships. The college is also home to a cycling team, which competes in Division I and holds national championships. The varsity sports teams are listed below.

Men's sports
 Basketball
 Cross county
 Cycling
 Lacrosse
 Soccer
 Tennis
 Track and field
 Volleyball
 Cheerleading
 Swimming

Women's sports
 Basketball
 Cross county
 Cycling
 Lacrosse
 Soccer
 Softball
 Tennis
 Track and field
 Volleyball
 Cheerleading
 Swimming

Notable alumni
Brent Bookwalter, professional cyclist
Troy Brown, professional football player
Thomas Ferebee, bombardier aboard the Enola Gay
Clark Gaines, professional football player (transferred to Wake Forest University)
Roy Lassiter, professional soccer player and Olympian
Will MacKenzie, professional golfer
Khano Smith, professional soccer player
John B. Stephenson, former professor at LMC
Carla Swart, professional cyclist
Andrew Talansky, professional cyclist
Leonard Wheeler, professional football player

References

External links
 
 Official athletics website
 Lees–McRae Yearbooks 1930-2006

 
Educational institutions established in 1900
Universities and colleges affiliated with the Presbyterian Church (USA)
Private universities and colleges in North Carolina
Universities and colleges accredited by the Southern Association of Colleges and Schools
Education in Avery County, North Carolina
Buildings and structures in Avery County, North Carolina
Liberal arts colleges in North Carolina
1900 establishments in North Carolina